The Green is a railway station on the 15-inch gauge Ravenglass & Eskdale Railway in the Lake District National Park and the English county of Cumbria. The station is situated on the southern edge of the village of Eskdale Green, overlooking the Eskdale valley and Muncaster Fell. It was originally known as King of Prussia after the nearby public house, and later as Eskdale Green. The Eskdale Green name has continued in popular use, and was still in official use in 2017 (as it was in previous years) in the railway's "full" timetable of intermediate stopping places.

The King George IV pub and Giggle Alley Japanese Gardens are within easy walking distance along a public road.

History
Originally the site of a siding used for local goods traffic, the first station was built in 1876, consisting of a short platform and small waiting shelter located next to the road bridge. The station building survived in the 15-inch gauge era, but was removed during the 1930s. In the early 1960s, the siding was removed and in 1965 construction of a new station building and platform commenced. The work was carried out by the Ravenglass and Eskdale Railway Preservation Society West Yorkshire Group, and was completed by 1968. The station remains largely in its 1968 condition, although a toilet was added around 1990, in order to improve facilities for volunteer staff and passengers.

Operations
Trains generally take 25 minutes to reach Ravenglass, and 15 minutes to reach Dalegarth. In high season, trains pass at 40-minute intervals in each direction.

The station is staffed during the summer months, when volunteers are available. There is a booking office inside the shelter building. There is no passing loop, and only simple one-train operations are possible. The station has an internal telephone link to other stations, and the railway control centre, and is connected to mains electricity. Buildings in use include a waiting shelter, booking office, and toilet. There is a very limited amount of car parking available. No real-time running information is provided.

Future Developments
The preservation society is considering a project to redevelop the current station building, providing better facilities for the station master and for passengers. The proposal would incorporate a partially under cover picnic area. Funding for the proposed development would be taken from a large legacy left to the preservation society by one of its former members.

Accessibility
Wheelchair users are able to join trains here, but prior notice must be given to the railway before the day of travel. Wheelchair users may alight at this station, if they have informed the guard in advance.

Gallery

References

Heritage railway stations in Cumbria
Ravenglass and Eskdale Railway